Convention Center station is a Baltimore Light Rail station in Baltimore, Maryland. It is located adjacent to the Baltimore Convention Center, and is also near the entrance to Oriole Park at Camden Yards. The Convention Center stop was originally called Pratt Street after the cross street by that name.

On July 10, 2019, the northbound accessible platform segment fell into a sinkhole caused by a broken water main. The incident caused the line to be closed between Camden and North Avenue until August 19.

References

External links

Station from Pratt Street from Google Maps Street View

Baltimore Light Rail stations
Downtown Baltimore
Railway stations in Baltimore